This is a list of people who were born, lived, died or are buried in Bournemouth, a large coastal resort town on the south coast of England.

Before 1900

 Christopher Crabb Creeke (1820–1886) architect and surveyor, shaped the early development of Bournemouth.
 Sir Merton Russell-Cotes FRGS (1835–1921) was Mayor of Bournemouth 1894–95
 Asia Booth Clarke (1835–1880) sister of John Wilkes Booth, assassin of Abraham Lincoln
 Sir Chaloner Alabaster KCMG (1838–1898) administrator in China.
 Dr Alfred Charles Coles MD DSc MRCP FRSE (1866–1944) physician, microbiologist and academic author
 Lucy Kemp-Welch (1869–1958) painter and teacher who specialized in painting working horses, including Black Beauty
 Frank Searle CBE, DSO, MIME (1874–1948) transport entrepreneur and locomotive engineer
 The Very. Rev Alfred Charles Eustace Jarvis KCB CMG MC (1876–1957) eminent Anglican priest
 Henry Roy Dean MD, LL.D, D.Sc, FRCP (1879–1961) professor of Pathology at the University of Cambridge
 Persis Kirmse (1884–1955) artist and illustrator known for her works of cats and dogs
 Marguerite Kirmse (1885–1954) artist, she specialised in drawings and latterly etchings of dogs
 Harold E. Lambert OBE (1893–1967) linguist and anthropologist in Kenya.
 Elisabeth Scott (1898–1972) architect who designed the Shakespeare Memorial Theatre

1900 to 1925 

 Edna Manley, OM (1900–1987) sculptor and contributor to Jamaican culture and wife of Norman Manley
 Frank Leslie Cross FBA (1900–1968) Anglican patristics scholar
 Sir Donald Coleman Bailey, OBE (1901–1985) civil engineer who invented the Bailey bridge
 Grace E. Pickford (1902–1986) biologist and endocrinologist
 Anthony Blunt (1907–1983) leading art historian and Soviet spy.
 Raymond Paley (1907–1933) mathematician, contributed to the Paley construction
 Barbara West (1911–2007) the penultimate remaining survivor of the sinking of the RMS Titanic on 14 April 1912
 Terence Wilmot Hutchison FBA (1912–2007) was an economist with an interest in Ludwig Wittgenstein
 Melita Norwood (1912–2005) British civil servant and KGB intelligence source
 Raymond Blackburn (1915–1991) Labour Party politician, MP for Birmingham King's Norton and Birmingham Northfield
 Berkeley Smith (1918–2003) broadcaster and a senior figure in the television world for nearly 40 years
 Morley Bury (1919-1999) painter and artist
 Otto Hutter (born 1924) physiologist came to UK as part of the Kindertransport, lives in Bournemouth
 Ivor Robinson MBE (1924–2014) master craftsman and fine bookbinder
 Oliver Frederick Ford (1925–1992) interior designer, served as decorator to the Queen Mother
 Sir Paul Leonard Fox, CBE (born 1925) television executive and Controller of BBC 1 between 1967/73

1925 to 1950 

 Ken Sprague (1927–2004) socialist political cartoonist, journalist and activist
 John Insall (1930–2000) pioneering orthopaedic surgeon, contributed to total knee replacement surgery
 Simon Preston (born 1938), organist, conductor and composer
 Sir Brian Keith Follett FRS DL (born 1939) chaired the Training and Development Agency for Schools from 2003-9
 Sir John Butterfill FRICS (born 1941) former politician. Conservative MP for Bournemouth West from 1983 to 2010
 Sir Rocco Giovanni Forte (born 1945) hotelier and the chairman of Rocco Forte Hotels
 Shelagh Cluett (1947–2007) artist and fine art lecturer
 Tom Wise  (born 1948) Independent and UKIP MEP for the East of England, former Police Officer, jailed for fraud
 Christine Hamilton (born 1949) media personality and author, married to Neil Hamilton
 Joe Armstrong (born 1950) computer scientist, author of the Erlang (programming language)
 Penny Vincenzi (1939–2017) novelist

Since 1950

 Digby Rumsey (born 1952) film director, producer, writer, cinematographer, editor, sound recordist and film diarist.
 Mark Austin (born 1958) journalist and television presenter, currently U.S. correspondent for Sky News
 Marc Koska OBE (born 1961) invented the non-reusable K1 auto-disable syringe
 Kimathi Donkor (born 1965) artist of large-scale figurative paintings
 Tobias Ellwood MP PC (born 1966) Conservative Party politician and author, MP for Bournemouth East
 Steve Bolton (born 1967) entrepreneur, property investor, author and philanthropist
 Karen Hardy (born 1970) professional ballroom dancer, coach, teacher and adjudicator
 Suw Charman-Anderson (born 1971) former Executive Director of the Open Rights Group
Conor Burns (born 1972), Conservative Party politician, MP for Bournemouth West
 Danny Tull (born 1977) director and film editor
 Stuart Semple (born 1980) artist and curator, uses large scale canvases incorporating text and found imagery
 Leilani Dowding (born 1980) former Page 3 girl, glamour model, television celebrity and UK entry Miss Universe 1998
 Chelsea White (born 1990) Page 3 girl and glamour model, photographer, and make-up artist
 Romy Simpkins (born 1993) actress, model, Mental health ambassador and beauty pageant titleholder

Actors

 Henry Howard Paul (1830–1905) American writer, playwright, comic actor and theatrical manager
 Gabrielle Brune (1912–2005) actress
 Tony Hancock (1924–1968) comedian and actor, Hancock's Half Hour
 Charles Gray (1928–2000) actor, Ernst Stavro Blofeld in the James Bond film Diamonds Are Forever
 Jan Waters (born 1937) theatre, television and film actress. She appeared in Jule Styne's Do Re Mi
 Michael Napier Brown (1937–2016) actor, theatre director, and playwright
 Juliette Kaplan (born 1939) actress, played Pearl Sibshaw in the BBC comedy Last of the Summer Wine
 Ray Lonnen (1940–2014) stage and television actor, was Willie Caine in The Sandbaggers (1978–80)
 James Walker (1940–2017) actor active in films and on television
 Julia Lockwood (born 1941) retired actress, daughter of Margaret Lockwood appeared in  Please Turn Over
 Michael E. Briant (born 1942) British television director, producer and actor
 Hetty Baynes (born 1956) film, television and theatre actress, formerly a ballet dancer
 Jayne Atkinson (born 1959) English-American actress who has worked in film, theatre, and television
 Julian Bleach (born 1963) actor, who is best known as co-creator and "MC" of Shockheaded Peter
 Janine Wood (born 1963) actress, played Clare France in the Thames TV sitcom After Henry (TV series)
 Alison Newman (born 1968) actress, Hazel Bailey in Footballers' Wives and DI Samantha Keeble in EastEnders.
 Christian Bale (born 1974) actor, attended Bournemouth School
 Neil Linpow (born 1982) actor
 Jack Donnelly (born 1985) actor, played the role of Jason in BBC series Atlantis
 Janet Montgomery (born 1985) film and TV actress
 Sarah Linda (born 1987) actress and model, known for her work in television, film and commercials
 Sophie Rundle (born 1988) actress, portrayed Ada Shelby in the BBC One series Peaky Blinders
 Ben Hardy (born 1991) actor, played Peter Beale in the BBC soap opera EastEnders and Roger Taylor in the 2018 biographical film Bohemian Rhapsody
 Ben Watton (born 1995) child actor
Millie Bobby Brown (born 2004) actress, portrayed Eleven (Stranger Things) in Netflix series, Stranger Things

Authors

 Mary Shelley (1797–1851) novelist, short story writer, dramatist, essayist, biographer and travel writer.
 John M. Davenport (1842–1913) Church of England clergyman and writer
 Harry Greenbank (1865–1899) author and dramatist
 Radclyffe Hall (1880–1943) poet and author, wrote The Well of Loneliness a groundbreaking work in lesbian literature
 Vera Chapman (1898–1996) author and founder of the Tolkien Society in the United Kingdom
 Dilys Powell CBE (1901–1995) journalist,  film critic of The Sunday Times for over fifty years
 Michael Roberts (1902–1948) poet, writer, critic and broadcaster and teacher
 Ron Smith (1924-2019) retired comic artist and writer
 Sarah Mary Malet Bradford, Viscountess Bangor (born 1938) author, best known for her royal biographies
 Patrick Ensor (1946–2007) newspaper journalist, editor of Guardian Weekly from 1993 to 2007
 Lesley Howarth (born 1952) author of children's and young adult fiction
 Mario Reading (1953–2017) author, his novels include The Music-Makers
 John Kay (born 1958) poet and teacher, lives in Bournemouth
 Susan Nelson (born 1961) science writer and broadcaster and a former BBC science correspondent

Military

 Major General Charles William Melvill CB, CMG, DSO (1878–1925) soldier in the British Army and New Zealand Military Forces
 Frederick Charles Riggs VC MM (1888–1918) recipient of the Victoria Cross
 Cecil Noble VC (1891–1915) recipient of the Victoria Cross
 Wing Commander Hubert Dinwoodie GC, OBE, MC (1896–1968) RAF officer and recipient of the George Cross
 Captain Keith Muspratt MC (1897–1918) First World War flying ace
 Captain Robert A. Birkbeck DFC (1898–1938) World War I flying ace
 Flight Lieutenant Charles John Sims DFC (1899–1929) World War I flying ace
 Brigadier Dame Cecilie Monica Golding, DBE (1902–1997) Army nurse, who rose to Colonel Commandant Queen Alexandra's Royal Army Nursing Corps
 Lieutenant Colonel Derek Anthony Seagrim VC (1903–1943) recipient of the Victoria Cross
 Daphne Pearson GC (1911–2000) one of only thirteen women recipients of the George Cross
 Alfie Fripp (1914–2013) Royal Air Force squadron leader, served six years as prisoner of war
 Les Long (1915–1944) Wellington bomber pilot, taken prisoner, escaped, re-captured and murdered by the Gestapo
 Richard Frewen Martin OBE, DFC and Bar, AFC (1918–2006) RAF pilot and test pilot
 Joanna Mary Salter (born 1968) first female fast jet pilot flying the Panavia Tornado ground attack aircraft

Musicians before 1950

 Sir Charles Hubert Hastings Parry, 1st Baronet (1848–1918) composer, teacher and historian of music.
 B. Mansell Ramsey (1849–1923) teacher, organist, amateur composer and amateur orchestra conductor
 Jay Wilbur (1898–1968) bandleader, influential in the era of Big Band and British dance band music
 Ernest Lush (1908–1988) classical pianist who was best known as an accompanist
 Max Harris (1918–2004) film and television composer and arranger. He played the piano and piano accordion
 Max Bygraves OBE (1922–2012) comedian, singer, actor and variety performer
 Anna Shuttleworth (born 1927) cellist
 Colin Eric Allen (born 1938) blues drummer and songwriter
 Andy Summers (born 1942) guitarist The Police
 Simon Preston CBE (born 1938) organist, conductor and composer
 John Hawken (born 1940) keyboard player, contributed to various versions of The Nashville Teens
 Don Partridge (1941–2010) singer and songwriter, known as the "king of the buskers"
 Zoot Money (born 1942) vocalist, keyboardist and bandleader, plays the Hammond organ
 Michael Giles (born 1942) drummer, best known as a co-founder of King Crimson in 1969
 Bob Brunning (1943–2011) the original bass guitar player with the blues rock band Fleetwood Mac
 Peter Bellamy (1944–1991) folk singer, founding member of The Young Tradition
 Andrew McCulloch (born 1945) drummer who worked with Manfred Mann, Anthony Phillips and King Crimson
 Gordon Haskell (1946-2020) musician and songwriter, pop, rock and blues vocalist, guitarist and bassist
 Lee Kerslake (1947-2020) longtime drummer and backing vocalist for Uriah Heep, worked with Ozzy Osbourne
 Richard Palmer-James (born 1947) musician, one of the founding members of Supertramp
 Darrell Sweet (1947–1999) drummer for the Scottish hard rock band Nazareth, formed in 1968
 John Wetton (1949–2017) singer, bassist, and songwriter with bands King Crimson, Roxy Music and Bryan Ferry

Musicians since 1950

 Pete Thompson (born 1952) rock drummer who has played with Silverhead, Robin Trower, & Robert Plant
 Robert Hart (born 1958) rock vocalist and songwriter. He is currently the lead singer of Manfred Mann's Earth Band
 Steven Mead (born 1962) virtuoso euphonium soloist and teacher
 Caroline Crawley (1963–2016) singer who sang for various bands including Shelleyan Orphan
 Simon Hilton (born 1967) music video, concert and documentary director and editor
 Russ Spencer (born 1969) television presenter and singer, member of manufactured pop group Scooch
 Gareth Malone OBE (born 1975) choirmaster and broadcaster, "animateur, presenter and populariser of choral singing".
 Nathan Johnson (musician) (born 1976) film composer, songwriter and music producer
 Ben Jones (born 1977) radio DJ and former children's television presenter
 Lou Brown (born 1978) singer-songwriter
 Amy Studt (born 1986) singer, songwriter and musician
 FuntCase / James Hazell (born 1986) dubstep and drum and bass producer
 East India Youth / William Doyle (born 1991) electronic musician
 Matt Johnson (born 1969) keyboardist with the band Jamiroquai

Sport

 Arthur Wiggins (1891–1961) rower who competed in the 1912 Summer Olympics
 Freddie Mills (1919–1965) boxer, world light heavyweight champion from 1948 to 1950
 Dave Bewley (1920–2013) professional footballer, made 141 pro appearances
 Barrie Meyer (1932–2015) footballer and cricketer, later a cricket umpire
 Virginia Wade OBE (born 1945) former professional tennis player, born in Bournemouth
 John Henry Dixon (born 1954) former first-class cricketer active from 1973 to 1988
 Forbes Phillipson-Masters (born 1955) former footballer who made approx. 230 pro. appearances
 Gary Emerson (born 1963) professional golfer
 Keith Stroud (born 1969) professional English football referee who officiates in the Football League and Premier League
 Masai Ujiri (born 1970)  president of basketball operations of the Toronto Raptors in the NBA
 Simon Clist (born 1981) footballer who plays as a midfielder, made 379 pro. appearances
 Lewis Price (born 1984) Welsh international footballer, who plays as a goalkeeper, approx. 150 pro. appearances
 Liam Norwell (born 1991) cricketer who currently plays for Gloucestershire
 Yasmin Kaashoek (born 1999) volleyball player
 Corey Jordan (born 1999) pro. footballer, plays as a defender for Premier League side Bournemouth

Died in Bournemouth 
Asia Booth Clarke (1835-1888) US born author and wife of actor John Sleeper Clarke, daughter of famous actor Junius Brutus Booth and sister of John Wilkes Booth actor and assassin of President Abraham Lincoln. 
 John Keble (1792–1866) Anglican priest and poet. lead the Oxford Movement at Keble College.
 Solomon Caesar Malan (1812–1894), a British divine, polyglot and well known orientalist.
 Lady Georgiana Fullerton (1812–1885), an English novelist, philanthropist and biographer.
 John Howson (1816–1885), a British divine from Giggleswick-on-Craven.
 Sir John Fowler, 1st Baronet (1817–1898), civil engineer, built railways and railway infrastructure.
 Hugh Cairns, 1st Earl Cairns (1819–1885), statesman, Lord Chancellor under Benjamin Disraeli.
 Andrew Kennedy Hutchison Boyd (1825–1899), Scottish author and divine.
 J. B. Lightfoot (1828–1889), an English theologian and Bishop of Durham.

References 

Bournemouth